The Jackson Hole American Legion Post No. 43 is a log building in Jackson, Wyoming, home to the local post of the American Legion. The post was built in 1928-29 and functioned as a community center. During its period of significance from 1929 to 1953 the post was instrumental in the shift of economic and political interests in Jackson Hole from a rural emphasis to urban interests.

References

External links
Jackson Hole American Legion Post No. 43 at the Wyoming State Historic Preservation Office

American Legion buildings
Buildings and structures in Teton County, Wyoming
Clubhouses on the National Register of Historic Places in Wyoming
Rustic architecture in Wyoming
National Register of Historic Places in Teton County, Wyoming